Giporlos (IPA: [ˌhiˈporlɔs]), officially the Municipality of Giporlos, is a 5th class municipality in the province of Eastern Samar, Philippines. According to the 2020 census, it has a population of 13,117 people.

Formerly, Giporlos was a barangay of the municipality of Balangiga, named San Bernardino.

Etymology
The name of the municipality was taken from the Waray-waray word Hi Podlos ('the sly one'), the nickname given to a woman who was nearly kidnapped by marauding "Moros" (Muslims). A folk story in the town tells of two women who went to a coastal area called "Rawis" to gather seashells only to be confronted by Moro men. One of the women, who was quite observant to her surroundings, was able to escape with haste. The other woman, who was already being dragged by the Moros to their vinta, squirmed her way out of their clutches like an eel ('to slip from capture'), leaving them clutching her skirt while she fled triumphantly, earning the name Hi Podlos. It is said that this name was changed to Hi Porlos to name the place or the whole area of settlement and was modified further by the Spaniards into its current spelling: Giporlos.

Barangays
Giporlos is politically subdivided into 18 barangays.

Demographics

Climate

Economy

References

External links

 [ Philippine Standard Geographic Code]
 Philippine Census Information
 Local Governance Performance Management System 

Municipalities of Eastern Samar